Thomas James Williams (born 4 May 1994) is an Englishman who played cricket and hockey for Oxford University.

Early life and career 
Williams was born at Epsom in May 1994.  He was educated at Epsom College, where he father was deputy headteacher.  From Epsom, he went up to read chemistry at Balliol College, Oxford.  While studying at Oxford, he made two appearances in first-class cricket for Oxford University against Cambridge University in The University Matches of 2013 and 2014.  In the 2013 fixture, he took a five wicket haul to help Oxford to victory by an innings and 186 runs, with Oxford's Sam Agarwal scoring a University Match record 313.  He was the first Old Epsomian to earn a cricket blue in over thirty years.  In addition to playing cricket for Oxford, he also represented the university at field hockey.

References

External links

1994 births
Living people
Cricketers from Epsom
People educated at Epsom College
Alumni of Balliol College, Oxford
English cricketers
Oxford University cricketers